Webber may refer to:

Webber, Kansas, a US city
Webber Township, Jefferson County, Illinois, USA
Webber Township, Lake County, Michigan, USA
Webber International University, in Babson Park, Florida, USA
Webber (surname), people with the surname Webber

See also 
 Weber (disambiguation)